"Rocks" is a song by Scottish rock band Primal Scream, taken from their fourth studio album, Give Out But Don't Give Up (1994). This song was the first indication of Primal Scream's change in musical style, when compared to their previous album, 1991's Screamadelica, which featured dance leanings. "Rocks" (and the whole Give Out But Don't Give Up album) features a more classic rock structure inspired by artists such as T. Rex, the Rolling Stones, and Faces. Faces singer Rod Stewart would later cover the song himself, including it on his 1998 album When We Were the New Boys.

"Rocks" was released as a single on 28 February 1994 and reached number seven on the UK Singles Chart, acting as a double A-side with another of the band's songs, "Funky Jam". Together, they were the highest-charting Primal Scream single until "Country Girl" reached number five in 2006. In 2018, the song received a Silver certification from the British Phonographic Industry (BPI) for sales and streams exceeding 200,000.

Track listings
All tracks were written by Bobby Gillespie, Andrew Innes, and Robert Young.

UK 7-inch and cassette single
 "Rocks" – 3:36
 "Funky Jam" (Hot Ass mix) – 5:21

UK 12-inch and CD single
 "Rocks" – 3:36
 "Funky Jam" (Hot Ass mix) – 5:21
 "Funky Jam" (club mix) – 5:27

US and New Zealand 7-inch single
 "Rocks" (album version) – 3:36
 "Everybody Needs Somebody" (album version) – 5:22

Charts

Weekly charts

Year-end charts

Certifications

References

1994 singles
1994 songs
Creation Records singles
Primal Scream songs
Sire Records singles
Song recordings produced by Tom Dowd
Songs written by Andrew Innes
Songs written by Bobby Gillespie
Songs written by Robert Young (musician)